Lamine Sidimé (born  1944) is a Guinean political figure who was Prime Minister of Guinea from 1999 to 2004.

Early life 
Born at Mamou in 1944, Sidimé served as President of the Supreme Court from 1992, and he was appointed as Prime Minister by President Lansana Conté in March 1999, replacing Sidya Touré. After five years in office, he resigned on February 23, 2004. He then resumed the Presidency of the Supreme Court.

References

Rulers.org

1944 births
Living people
Guinean judges
People from Mamou
Prime Ministers of Guinea